Kakonkaruk (also, Cakanaruk and Kakontaruk) is a former Rumsen settlement in Monterey County, California. It was located in the Big Sur area; its precise location is unknown.

References

Rumsen villages
Santa Lucia Range
Former Native American populated places in California
Former settlements in Monterey County, California